Robert Smith (1722February 11, 1777) was a Scottish-born American architect who was based in Philadelphia.  Smith's work includes buildings such as Carpenters' Hall, St. Peter's Church, and the steeple on Christ Church. These structures constituted the greater part of the city's early skyline.  Other works include Nassau Hall at Princeton University and the Public Hospital in Williamsburg, Virginia.  He worked exclusively in the Georgian style.

Early life
Smith was born in Dalkeith Parish, Midlothian, Scotland into a family that included many masons.  As a young man he apprenticed in the building trades, and emigrated to America, either directly from Scotland or via London it is unknown, in late 1748.

Philadelphia
Smith quickly became a member of the Carpenters' Company of Philadelphia, and is considered by many to be the foremost master-builder, or carpenter-architect, of the Colonial Period.  In fact, Robert Smith, has been called "America's most important 18th Century architect." He also served as the Master Carpenter on Carpenters' Hall, overseeing its design and construction from 1770–1774.

Working from published architectural sketchbooks or models of the past, a master-builder would adapt his designs to the building needs and materials of the colonial city.  A famous client of Smith's was Benjamin Franklin.  While living abroad, Franklin wrote a letter to his wife Deborah in which he complained that Smith was taking too long to complete their house.

Other notable projects on which Smith worked in and around Philadelphia include the steeple of Christ Church, Walnut Street Prison,  Nassau Hall at Princeton University and St. Peter's Church.

It is likely that Smith had a hand in shaping the Carpenter's Company's 1783 handbook for standards of workmanship and pricing.  Entitled The Rules of Work of the Carpenter's Company of the City and County of Philadelphia, this pattern and specifications booklet was one of the first trade manuals printed in America.  It was "loaned" to every member of the Company and kept a closely guarded trade secret. 
Smith was active in cultural and political affairs.  In addition to membership in the Carpenters' Company, Smith was also in the American Philosophical Society and the First Continental Congress.  He was appointed by the city of Philadelphia as a Regulator of Party Walls and Partition Fences, a plum political position roughly akin to Building Inspector.

During the American Revolutionary War, Smith constructed chevaux-de-frise.  These were boxes containing sharp metal-tipped wooden spikes which were weighted down with stones and sunk in the Delaware River to rip holes in the hulls of British warships.  Smith died during the War while working on the American Army barracks at Fort Billingsport, New Jersey, part of the defenses on the Delaware River. He is buried in Philadelphia.

References

External links

 Robert Smith - Princeton
 Public Hospital - Williamsburg

1722 births
1777 deaths
Kingdom of Scotland emigrants to the Thirteen Colonies
Scottish architects
People from Midlothian
Architects from Philadelphia
People of Pennsylvania in the American Revolution
People of colonial Pennsylvania
Burials in Pennsylvania